Krasny Oktyabr (Qıźıl Oktyabr) is a rural locality (a village) in Mrakovsky Selsoviet, Gafuriysky District, Bashkortostan, Russia. The population was 11 as of 2010. There is 1 street.

Geography 
Krasny Oktyabr is located 40 km southwest of Krasnousolsky (the district's administrative centre) by road. Kateninovsky is the nearest rural locality.

References 

Rural localities in Gafuriysky District